Return Meigs may refer to:

Return J. Meigs Sr. (1740–1823), American Revolutionary War officer, federal Indian agent
Return J. Meigs Jr., (1764–1825), Governor of Ohio, U.S. Postmaster General